Leard Sadriu (born 22 April 2001) is a Kosovan professional footballer who plays as a centre-back for Slovenian PrvaLiga side Mura and the Kosovo national team.

Club career

Shkëndija
On 14 December 2017, Sadriu signed a three-year contract with Macedonian First League club Shkëndija. On 25 January 2018, the club confirmed that Sadriu's transfer was permanent. His debut with Shkëndija came on 7 April in a 5–0 home win against Renova after coming on as a substitute in place of Egzon Bejtulai.

Loan at Skënderbeu Korçë
On 11 January 2021, Sadriu joined Kategoria Superiore side Skënderbeu Korçë, on a season-long loan. His debut with Skënderbeu Korçë came five days later in a 2–1 home defeat against Partizani Tirana after being named in the starting line-up.

Mura
On 6 September 2022, Sadriu signed a three-year contract with Slovenian PrvaLiga side Mura.

International career
From 2017 to 2022, Sadriu represented Kosovo at the under-17, under-19, and under-21 youth international levels, and made a total of 21 competitive appearances for all three teams. On 30 May 2022, he received a call-up from the senior team for training session before the 2022–23 UEFA Nations League matches against Cyprus, Greece and Northern Ireland, but did not make the final squad. His debut with the senior team came on 16 November 2022 in a friendly match against Armenia, after being named in the starting line-up and playing the entire match.

References

External links

2001 births
Living people
People from Ferizaj
Kosovan footballers
Kosovo youth international footballers
Kosovo under-21 international footballers
Kosovo international footballers
Kosovan expatriate footballers
Expatriate footballers in North Macedonia
Kosovan expatriate sportspeople in North Macedonia
Expatriate footballers in Albania
Kosovan expatriate sportspeople in Albania
Expatriate footballers in Slovenia
Kosovan expatriate sportspeople in Slovenia
Association football central defenders
Football Superleague of Kosovo players
KF Ferizaj players
Macedonian First Football League players
KF Shkëndija players
Kategoria Superiore players
KF Skënderbeu Korçë players
Slovenian PrvaLiga players
NŠ Mura players